Jessica T. Lauser /LAWser/ is a visually-impaired American chess player and the current, 5-time reigning U.S. Blind Chess Champion. (She recently won this event, for the fifth year in a row, after competing October 29th-30th, in Pittsburgh.)

Born at just 24 weeks’ gestation, she experienced a well-known complication affecting micro-preemies, called retinopathy of prematurity, or ROP, causing permanent vision-loss during her first few months of life. ROP (and subsequent cataracts) left Lauser effectively blind in one eye, with 20/480 uncorrectable acuity in the other; hers is the same eye condition affecting musician Stevie Wonder.

First learning chess at age 7, Lauser became more involved with it at age 12, as a means to combat incessant teasing by classmates in the 7th and 8th grades, soon earning her the moniker, “Chessica.” She later took up more frequent rated play as an adult, most notably making history by becoming the first-ever (and so far only) woman to win the national championship for blind and visually-impaired players, which she’s done every year, since 2018.

Lauser received dual Bachelor’s degrees from San Francisco State University and the University of Alaska Anchorage (in History and Russian respectively), while working various jobs, predominantly clerical in nature. Likewise, she has qualified, nine times out of nine attempts so far, to play for medals and titles representing the United States, in world chess events including Olympiads, for the blind and visually impaired, overseas.  

In November 2020, she joined TeamUSA which took part in the 1st FIDE Online Olympiad for People with Disabilities. The team, having representatives of other disabilities besides blindness, was initially seeded 39th in this event, but finished tied for tenth in the world, placing sixteenth on tiebreaks. In 2021, she took part in the 4th FIDE World Championship for People with Disabilities, held November 4th-14th, 2021, online, as one of only four Americans—the only U.S. woman—to compete.  

Her most recent international event was the 10th IBCA (International Braille Chess Association) Pan-American Championship for the Blind & Visually Impaired, held October 23rd-29th, 2022, in Mexico City. Being one of only two Americans to play, Lauser won a silver medal among the women, while representing the United States, the first time U.S. citizens took part in that event. 

An avid competitor, having played 364 USCF-rated tournaments, so far, Lauser presently enjoys national rankings on six Top Player lists in the U.S. (among the exclusively fully-sighted, as there is no list for the blind and visually impaired), while regularly frequenting various chess sites, including Chess.com, Lichess, ICC, and the FIDE Online Arena. She currently resides in Missouri.

References 

American chess players
Year of birth missing (living people)
Living people